Wadda Khan is a 1983 Pakistani Punjabi language action movie, directed by Diljeet Mirza and produced by Mian Mohammad Hafeez. Film starring actor Yousuf Khan in the lead role and with Rani and Mustafa Qureshi as the villain.

Cast
 Yousuf Khan
 Sultan Rahi
 Asif Khan
 Mustafa Qureshi
 Rani
 Muhammad Ali - وڈا خان
 Khanum
 Allauddin
 Saqi 
 Sawan
 Nayyar Sultana
 Salma Mumtaz
 Tani
 Shujaat Hashmi
 Talish
 Mizla
 Nossi
 Jaggi Malik
 Changezi

Soundtrack
The music of Wadda Khan is composed by Safdar Hussain with lyrics penned by Waris Ludhyanvi. The album earned

Track listing

References

External links
Wadda Khan (1983 film) on IMDb website

1980s crime action films
Pakistani crime action films
1983 films
Punjabi-language Pakistani films
1980s Punjabi-language films